The 2002 Clemson Tigers baseball team represented Clemson University in the 2002 NCAA Division I baseball season. The team played their home games at Beautiful Tiger Field in Clemson, SC.

The team was coached by Jack Leggett, who completed his ninth season at Clemson.  The Tigers reached the 2002 College World Series, their tenth appearance in Omaha.

Roster

Schedule

Ranking movements

References

Clemson
Clemson Tigers baseball seasons
Clemson baseball
College World Series seasons
Clemson